The W47 was an American thermonuclear warhead used on the Polaris A-1 sub-launched ballistic missile system. Various models were in service from 1960 through the end of 1974. The warhead was developed by the Lawrence Radiation Laboratory between 1957 and 1960.

The Y1 model had design yield of 600 kilotons and the Y2 model had a doubled design yield of 1.2 megatons.
 The W47 was the first warhead with a new, miniaturized pit. The aerodynamic flare at the base provided stability of orientation during descent. Two small rocket motors were used to spin the warhead for better stability and symmetry during reentry.

Design

Live fire testing
The W47 is the only US ICBM or SLBM warhead to have been live fired in an atmospheric missile and warhead test, on May 6, 1962. This event took place during shot Frigate Bird which was part of the Dominic test series. While stationed off Johnston Island, the American submarine  fired a Polaris-A2 missile at an open ocean target point in the vicinity of Palmyra Atoll, south of Hawaii. The detonation was successful and had the full design yield of the W47Y1 at approximately 600 kilotons. The shot was designed to improve confidence in the US ballistic missile systems, though even after the test there was considerable controversy. This was partly because it was revealed that the warhead selected for the test had undergone modifications before testing and was not necessarily representative of the stockpile.

Reliability controversy
The W47 warhead had a series of serious reliability problems with the warhead design. 300 of the EC-47 production prototype model were produced from April 1960 through June 1960, and were all promptly retired in June 1960 due to reliability concerns. Production of Y1 and Y2 models then proceeded in 1960 through 1964. A total of 1060 Y1 and Y2 models were produced, but they were found to have so many reliability problems that no more than 300 were ever in service at any given time. In 1966, 75% of the stockpiled Y2 warheads were thought to be defective and unusable. Repair programs continued for some time.

A number of the Polaris warheads were replaced in the early 1960s, when corrosion of the pits was discovered during routine maintenance.

Failures of the W45, W47, and W52 warheads are still an active part of the debate about the reliability of the US nuclear weapons force moving into the future, without ongoing nuclear testing.

A one-point safety test performed on the W47 warhead just prior the 1958 moratorium (Hardtack/Neptune) failed, yielding a 100-ton explosion. Because the test ban prohibited the testing needed for inherently safe one-point safe designs, a makeshift solution was adopted: a boron-cadmium wire was folded inside the pit during manufacture, and pulled out by a small motor during the warhead arming process. Unfortunately, this wire had a tendency to become brittle during storage, and break or get stuck during arming, which prevented complete removal and rendered the warhead a dud. It was estimated that 50-75% of warheads would fail. This required a complete rebuild of the W47 primaries. The oil used for lubricating the wire also promoted corrosion of the pit.

See also
 UGM-27 Polaris
 List of nuclear weapons

References

External links
 Dominic nuclear test series, including Frigate Bird Polaris/W47 flight test
 

Nuclear warheads of the United States
Lawrence Livermore National Laboratory
Military equipment introduced in the 1960s